{{Taxobox
| name = Turbonilla bahiensis
| image = 
| image_caption = 
| regnum = Animalia
| phylum = Mollusca
| classis = Gastropoda
| unranked_superfamilia = clade Heterobranchiaclade Euthyneuraclade Panpulmonata
| superfamilia = Pyramidelloidea
| familia = Pyramidellidae
| subfamilia = 
| genus = Turbonilla 
| subgenus = 
| species = 'T. bahiensis| binomial = Turbonilla bahiensis| binomial_authority = (Castellanos, 1982)
| synonyms_ref = 
| synonyms = Eulimella bahiensis Castellanos, 1982 (basionym)
}}Turbonilla bahiensis is a species of sea snail, a marine gastropod mollusk in the family Pyramidellidae, the pyrams and their allies.

According to a study published in November 2011 in Zootaxa, this species does not belong in Eulimella''

Description
The shell grows to a length of 5 mm.

Distribution
This species occurs in the Atlantic Ocean off Argentina.

References

External links
 To Encyclopedia of Life
 To World Register of Marine Species

bahiensis
Gastropods described in 1982